WFXJ (930 kHz "Acción 97.3") is a commercial AM radio station in Jacksonville, Florida.  It airs a Spanish news/talk radio format and is owned by iHeartMedia, Inc.  WFXJ is also streamed on accionjacksonville.iheart.com and on the iHeartRadio app.

The station's studios and offices are located on Central Parkway in Jacksonville's Southside neighborhood.  The transmitter is off Hyde Grove Avenue on Jacksonsonville's Westside.  WFXJ transmits with 5,000 watts around the clock.  By day it uses a non-directional antenna, but at night, to protect other stations on AM 930, it switches to a directional signal aimed toward the east.

History
WFXJ is the oldest radio station in Jacksonville.  It signed on the air in November 1925 as WJAX.  During the 1930s, WJAX broadcast on 900 kilocycles at 1,000 watts.  While most radio stations of its day were owned by department stores or newspapers, WJAX was owned by the City of Jacksonville.  WJAX was an NBC Red Network affiliate. In 1941, with the enactment of the North American Regional Broadcasting Agreement (NARBA) WJAX moved to 930 kHz.  It also got a boost to 5,000 watts.

In the 1990s, the station was carrying a talk radio format, owned by Florida businessman Bud Paxson.  It used the call sign WNZS (standing for "News") and carried world and national news from the NBC Radio Network.  But as sports radio stations were gaining popularity around the country, WNZS switched to an all-sports format.  Clear Channel Communications (original name of today's iHeartMedia) acquired WNZS in the late 1990s.  Because Clear Channel has a financial interest in the Fox Sports Radio Network, the station became a Fox Sports affiliate.  On March 16, 2001, the call letters were switched to WFXJ to reflect the Fox Sports affiliation, and the home city of Jacksonville.

In July 2015, WFXJ hired Seth Harp as its new Director of Programming and afternoon drive time host.

On September 5, 2018, WFXJ rebranded as "930 The Game."

On March 15, 2019, WFXJ began simulcasting on FM translator W247CF, and rebranded as "97.3 The Game."  The FM translator switched to a Regional Mexican format in May 2020, leaving sports programming only on AM 930.  Without the FM translator, WFXJ returned to the branding "930 The Game."

On January 22, 2021, WFXJ ended its sports format, flipping to urban gospel music as "Hallelujah 930". Just six months later, on July 26, 2021, WFXJ flipped to Spanish news/talk, branded as "Acción 97.3" (simulcast once again on translator W247CF).

Previous logos

References

External links

Callsign data for WFXJ from the F.C.C.'s C.D.B.S..

FXJ
Radio stations established in 1925
IHeartMedia radio stations
1925 establishments in Florida
FXJ
Spanish-language radio stations in Florida
News and talk radio stations in the United States